Bullas is a Spanish Denominación de Origen Protegida (DOP) for wines located in the region of Murcia (Spain) and covers the territories of eight different municipalities, including Caravaca de la Cruz, Moratalla and Bullas itself.  The region is renowned for its young reds and rosés made from the Monastrell grape variety.

History
The town of Bullas has existed since the times of the ancient Romans and grew during the centuries of Moorish dominion of the Iberian Peninsula. After its reconquest by Christian forces in the 13th century its prosperity increased due to agriculture and wine production.

The region used to produce wine in bulk until the 1980s when private wineries began to invest in the equipment and technology required for the production of bottled and labelled quality wine.  It acquired official DO status in 1994.

Geography

Bullas is located halfway between the city of Murcia, the regional capital, and the mountains in the west that form the frontier with Andalusia. The landscape is rugged and slopes upwards from south to north. It comprises numerous small valleys with individual microclimates.

The soils on the slopes are brown and so hard that they have to be broken mechanically before vines can be planted. They are lime bearing and have a top crust, poor in organic matter, and have good drainage.

The DOP is divided into 3 sub-zones, each one of which has a distinct identity and produces characteristic wines.

Northwest
The Northwest sub-zone is the most important one in terms of area (52%), number of wineries and quality of the wine. It includes the municipalities of Caravaca de la Cruz, Moratalla and part of Lorca. The main grape varieties used in this sub-zone are Monastrell and Tempranillo.

Central

Northeast
The Northeast sub-zone, the smallest of the three, covering only 8% of the DOP includes the municipalities of Calasparra, Ricote, Bullas and Mula.

Climate
The climate in Bullas DOP is characterised by its very hot summers, though not as hot as the other DOPs in Murcia. There are occasional freezing winds from the mountains and frosts are common between the months of October and April. The average temperature is 16 °C with maximums of 39 °C in summer and minimums of -4 °C in winter. There are also occasional violent storms in September and October.

Grapes
The main grape variety planted is Monastrell which represents over 80% of all grapes planted.

 Red grape varieties: Monastrell, Cabernet Sauvignon, Garnacha Tinta, Syrah, Tempranillo, Merlot, Petit Verdot.

 White grape varieties: Airén, Chardonnay, Macabeo, Malvasía, Moscatel de Alejandría, Sauvignon Blanc, Moscatel de Grano Menudo.

References

External links
 D.O. Bullas official website

Wine regions of Spain